Tuzi (or Tuzi) is a small town in Montenegro and the seat of Tuzi Municipality, Montenegro. It is located along a main road between the city of Podgorica and the Albanian border crossing, just a few kilometers north of Lake Skadar. The Church of St. Anthony and Qazimbeg's Mosque are located in the centre of the town. Tuzi is the newest municipality in Montenegro, having been an independent municipality since 1 September 2018.

Geography
Tuzi is situated to the northwest of Lake Shkodra, 10 km from Podgorica, 150 km from Dubrovnik (Croatia) and 130 km to Tirana (Albania). It is surrounded by forests and mountains that are further connected with the Accursed Mountains.

History

The town of Tuzi is situated in Southeastern Montenegro, between Podgorica and the Skadar lake. The Albanian community of Tuzi descend from the surrounding tribes of Hoti, Gruda, Trieshi and Koja, which are part of the Malësor tribes.

Tuzi was mentioned in 1330 in the Dečani chrysobulls as part of the Albanian (arbanas) katun (semi-nomadic pastoral community) of Llesh Tuzi (Ljesa Tuzi in the original), in an area stretching southwards from modern Tuzi Municipality along the Lake Skadar to a village near modern Koplik. This katund included many communities that later formed their own separate communities: Reçi and his sons, Matagushi, Bushati and his sons, Pjetër Suma and Pjetër Kuçi, first known ancestor of Kuči. Llesh Tuzi is the first named progenitor of the Tuzi tribe (fis), which gave its name to the settlement of Tuzi. The Suma and Tuzi fis formed the vast majority of the later Gruda community.

Tuzi was documented in the Ottoman defter of 1485 as part of the Timar of Hasan Arnauti, with 24 houses and 6 bachelors. Albanian anthroponomy dominated amongst the inhabitants of Tuzi, with names such as Leka, Ulku, Deda, Nika, Pali etc.

Following the Great Schism of 1054, the tribes of Tuzi embraced Roman Catholicism over Eastern Orthodoxy. Following the expansion of Ottoman rule in the Balkans in the 14th century, many gradually converted to Islam. Some of them adopted new surnames common among Ottoman Muslims while others kept their original surnames. Albanian surnames present among Muslim and Christian families alike include Gjokaj, Nikaj, Dreshaj, etc.

The Albanian flag was raised for the first time in possibly over 400 years in the Battle of Deçiq (6 April 1911) in the Albanian revolt of 1911 in the Deçiq mountain near Tuzi. It was raised by Ded Gjo Luli on the peak of Bratila after victory was secured. The phrase "Tash o vllazën do t’ju takojë të shihni atë që për 450 vjet se ka pa kush" (Now brothers you have earned the right to see that which has been unseen for 450 years) has been attributed to Ded Gjo Luli by later memoirs of those who were present when he raised the flag. It was one of three banners brought to Malësia by Palokë Traboini, student in Austria. The other two banners were used by Ujka of Gruda and Prelë Luca of Triepshi.

During the Islamization of the region, the area had a mixed Slavic-Albanian amount of names. For example, Mahmut and Husein were sons of Abdulah, Osman which was the son of Živo, then Ibrahim and then Gojaš. In Gruda, Hizar was the son of Vučin which was the son of Mezid which's father was Gjergj. Similar patterns continue like this with Gjon and Stojan.

21st century 
From 24 March 2020 until further notice, the entirety of Tuzi Municipality has been put into a complete lockdown in response to the sudden increase of cases of the COVID-19 pandemic in Montenegro, with only essential services being allowed to operate. Tuzi is the first municipality in Montenegro that was put in a complete lockdown during the COVID-19 pandemic.

Sports
Tuzi's local football club is Dečić, who play in the Montenegrin First League. Their home venue is the Stadion Tuško Polje and their reserve team plays in the Montenegrin Third League.

Demographics
According to 2011 census, the town of Tuzi has a population of 4,748, while Tuzi Municipality has 11,422 residents.

International relations

Twin towns — Sister cities
Tuzi is twinned with:

 Rochester Hills, United States

References

Books 

Populated places in Tuzi Municipality
Albanian communities in Montenegro